Gapa Hele Bi Sata (1976) is the first colour film in the Odia Language. It was directed by Nagen Roy starring Harish Mohapatra and Banaja Mohanty. The story was penned by Basant Mohapatra and screenplayed by P.D. Cinematographer: Surendra kumar Sahoo, Art Director : Nikhil Baran Sengupta, Shenoy.

References

 https://www.imdb.com/title/tt0312712

1976 films
1970s Odia-language films